Happy People may refer to:

 Happy People: A Year in the Taiga, a 2010 film by Werner Herzog

Albums
 Happy People (Paulinho da Costa album) or the title song, 1979
 Happy People (Peace album) or the title song, 2015
 Happy People/U Saved Me or the title song (see below), by R. Kelly, 2004
 The Happy People or the title track, by the Cannonball Adderley Quintet, 1972
 Happy People, by Kenny Garrett, 2002
 Happy People or the title song, by Offer Nissim, 2008

Songs
 "Happy People" (R. Kelly song), 2004
 "Happy People" (Little Big Town song), 2017
 "Happy People" (The Temptations song), 1974
 "Happy People", by Pet Shop Boys from Hotspot, 2020
 "Happy People", by Yazoo from You and Me Both, 1983